Kasba is a census town in Raiganj CD Block in Raiganj subdivision of Uttar Dinajpur district in the Indian state of West Bengal.

Geography

Location
Kasba is located at

Demographics
As per the 2011 Census of India, Kasba had a total population of 10,067, of which 5,221 (52%) were males and 4,846 (48%) were females. Population below 6 years was 914. The total number of literates in Kasba was 7,695 (84.07% of the population over 6 years).

 India census, Kasba had a population of 9,842. Males constitute 53% of the population and females 47%. Kasba has an average literacy rate of 73%, higher than the national average of 59.5%: male literacy is 79%, and female literacy is 67%. In Kasba, 11% of the population is under 6 years of age.

References

Cities and towns in Uttar Dinajpur district